Thalli is a state assembly constituency in Krishnagiri district in Tamil Nadu, India. Its State Assembly Constituency number is 56. It comprises a portion of Denkanikottai taluk and is a part of Krishnagiri constituency for national elections to the Parliament of India. It is one of the 234 State Legislative Assembly Constituencies in Tamil Nadu in India.

Members of the Assembly

Election results

2021

2016

2011

2006

2001

1996

1991

1989

1984

1980

1977

References 

 

Assembly constituencies of Tamil Nadu
Krishnagiri district